Jacob Rummel (April 17, 1857 – 1928) was an American cigarmaker and Socialist from Milwaukee who served one term (1905–1908) as a member of the Wisconsin State Senate representing the 6th Senate district (9th, 10th, 19th, 20th, and 22nd wards of the city of Milwaukee).

Background 
Rummel was born on April 17, 1857 in Washington County, Wisconsin, where he attended public schools. He came to Milwaukee in 1872 and entered college, and learned the cigar trade, becoming foreman for Williams & Brendle Cigar Mfg. Co. He died at his home in Milwaukee in 1928.

Elective office 
He was elected state senator on the Social Democratic ticket in 1904 from the Sixth district (9th, 10th, 19th, 20th and 22nd wards of the City of Milwaukee), a seat held by Republican Rip Reukema (who did not seek re-election). Rummel received 5,848 votes against 5,801 for August J. Langhoff (Republican), and 3,127 for Gottfried Hergarten (Democrat).

He did not run for re-election in 1908, and was succeeded by fellow Socialist Winfield Gaylord.

See also
Politics of the United States

References

External links

1857 births
Cigar makers
Politicians from Milwaukee
People from Washington County, Wisconsin
Socialist Party of America politicians from Wisconsin
Wisconsin state senators
1928 deaths